LifeTalk Radio is a network of over 200 radio stations featuring Christian music, Christian talk and teaching, and other religious programming. Its headquarters are in Riverside, California. LifeTalk Radio is the only radio network owned by the North American Division of the Seventh-day Adventist Church, and is a ministry of the Adventist Media Center.

History
In 1991, LifeTalk Radio was founded by Paul Moore, in Yakima, Washington. In 2000, the network's headquarters moved to Vonore, Tennessee. In October 2001, Moore was given the Society of Adventist Communicators' "Award of Pioneering Innovation" for creating the network. In 2002, Moore retired as president of LifeTalk Radio, and was replaced by Phil Follett. On July 15, 2004, Steven Gallimore became president of LifeTalk Radio, and the network moved its headquarters to Collegedale, Tennessee later that year. In 2011, LifeTalk Radio moved its headquarters to Simi Valley, California. By 2015, the network's headquarters had been moved to Riverside, California.

LifeTalk Radio's first radio station, KSOH in Yakima, Washington, began broadcasting in March 1992. The station was launched with an "interactive talk radio" format, airing Christian talk programming. In 1996, LifeTalk Radio purchased and launched several additional stations. In 2000, the network was heard on 15 stations, 8 of which were owned by the network. By 2004, LifeTalk Radio was airing on 35 stations, by 2005 it was airing on 65 stations, and by 2008 the network was airing on 70 stations. By 2015, the network was airing on over 100 stations.

Stations
LifeTalk Radio is heard on over 77 full-time and part-time affiliates in the United States, along with 113 additional affiliates internationally. LifeTalk Radio also streams through Roku.

Owned and operated stations

Translators

Fulltime affiliates

Translators

References

External links
Official website

1992 establishments in Washington (state)
American radio networks
Christian radio stations in the United States
Radio broadcasting companies of the United States
Radio stations established in 1992
Radio stations in Yakima, Washington
Independent ministries of the Seventh-day Adventist Church
Adventist organizations established in the 20th century